was a Japanese botanist specializing in bryology.

Inoue's botanical publications are from Japan.  He described or recognized many species of liverworts.

Selected publications
 Hattori, S. & H. Inoue. (1958). "Preliminary report on Takakia lepidozioides." Journal of the Hattori Botanical Laboratory 18: 133–137.
 Inoue, H. (1966). "Monosoleniaceae, a new family segregated from the Marchantiaceae." Bulletin of the National Science Museum (Tokyo) 9(2): 115–118, +2 pl.
 Inoue, H. (1976). "The concept of genus in the Plagiochilaceae." Journal of the Hattori Botanical Laboratory 41: 13–17.
 Inoue, H. (1984). The genus Plagiochila (Dum.) Dum. in southeast Asia. Tokyo: Academic Scientific Book, Inc., 142 pages.

References

Further reading

 
 
 
 
 
 
 
 
 
 

1932 births
1989 deaths
20th-century Japanese botanists
Botanists with author abbreviations
Bryologists